The 1973 Kangaroo Tour was the thirteenth Kangaroo Tour, and saw the Australian national rugby league team travel to Europe and play nineteen matches against British and French club and representative rugby league teams, in addition to three Test matches against Great Britain and two Tests against the French. It followed the tour of 1967-68 and the next was staged in 1978.

The squad's leadership 
The team was captain-coached by Graeme Langlands making his third Kangaroo Tour. Managers of the team were Albert Bishop and Charlie Gibson with Alf Richards as the team trainer.

Touring squad 
The following players were in the touring squad.

|- bgcolor="#CCCCFF"
| Player
| Club
| Position(s)
| Tests
| Games
| Tries
| Goals
| F/Goals
| Points
|-
|- bgcolor="#FFFFFF"
| Arthur Beetson (vc)
|  Eastern Suburbs Roosters
| 
| align=right | 5
| align=right | 16
| align=right | 3
| align=right | 0
| align=right | 0
| align=right | 9
|-
|- bgcolor="#FFFFFF"
| Ray Branighan
|  Manly-Warringah Sea Eagles
| 
| align=right | 4
| align=right | 13
| align=right | 7
| align=right | 2
| align=right | 0
| align=right | 25
|-
|- bgcolor="#FFFFFF"
| Mick Cronin
|  Gerringong Lions
| 
| align=right | 2
| align=right | 12
| align=right | 7
| align=right | 28
| align=right | 0
| align=right | 77
|-
|- bgcolor="#FFFFFF"
| Graham Eadie
|  Manly-Warringah Sea Eagles
| 
| align=right | 2
| align=right | 10
| align=right | 4
| align=right | 9 
| align=right | 0
| align=right | 30
|-
|- bgcolor="#FFFFFF"
| Bob Fulton
|  Manly-Warringah Sea Eagles
| 
| align=right | 5
| align=right | 14
| align=right | 20
| align=right | 0
| align=right | 1
| align=right | 61
|-
|- bgcolor="#FFFFFF"
| Ted Goodwin
|  St George Dragons
| 
| align=right | 3
| align=right | 10
| align=right | 7
| align=right | 0
| align=right | 0
| align=right | 21
|-
|- bgcolor="#FFFFFF"
| Bill Hamilton
|  Manly-Warringah Sea Eagles
| 
| align=right | 0
| align=right | 8
| align=right | 1
| align=right | 0
| align=right | 0
| align=right | 3
|-
|- bgcolor="#FFFFFF"
| John Lang
|  Eastern Suburbs Tigers (Qld)
| 
| align=right | 1
| align=right | 7
| align=right | 2
| align=right | 0
| align=right | 0
| align=right | 6
|-
|- bgcolor="#FFFFFF"
| Graeme Langlands (c)
|  St George Dragons
| 
| align=right | 1
| align=right | 8
| align=right | 4
| align=right | 27
| align=right | 0
| align=right | 66
|-
|- bgcolor="#FFFFFF"
| Ken Maddison
|  Cronulla-Sutherland Sharks
| 
| align=right | 4
| align=right | 13
| align=right | 6
| align=right | 0
| align=right | 0
| align=right | 18
|-
|- bgcolor="#FFFFFF"
| Bob McCarthy (vc)
|  South Sydney Rabbitohs
| 
| align=right | 2
| align=right | 8
| align=right | 4
| align=right | 0
| align=right | 0
| align=right | 12 
|-
|- bgcolor="#FFFFFF"
| John O'Neill
|  Manly-Warringah Sea Eagles
| 
| align=right | 1
| align=right | 6
| align=right | 0
| align=right | 0
| align=right | 0
| align=right | 0
|-
|- bgcolor="#FFFFFF"
| Bob O'Reilly
|  Parramatta Eels
| 
| align=right | 4
| align=right | 13
| align=right | 0
| align=right | 0 
| align=right | 0
| align=right | 0
|-
|- bgcolor="#FFFFFF"
| Warren Orr
|  Wests Panthers (Qld)
| 
| align=right | 0
| align=right | 6
| align=right | 4
| align=right | 0
| align=right | 0
| align=right | 12
|-
|- bgcolor="#FFFFFF"
| Tim Pickup
|  North Sydney Bears
| 
| align=right | 4
| align=right | 12
| align=right | 2
| align=right | 0
| align=right | 0
| align=right | 6
|-
|- bgcolor="#FFFFFF"
| Greg Pierce
|  Cronulla-Sutherland Sharks
| 
| align=right | 1
| align=right | 8
| align=right | 1
| align=right | 0
| align=right | 0
| align=right | 3
|-
|- bgcolor="#FFFFFF"
| Terry Randall
|  Manly-Warringah Sea Eagles
| 
| align=right | 0
| align=right | 5
| align=right | 1
| align=right | 0
| align=right | 0
| align=right | 3
|-
|- bgcolor="#FFFFFF"
| Tom Raudonikis (vc)
|  Western Suburbs Magpies
| 
| align=right | 4
| align=right | 10
| align=right | 3
| align=right | 0
| align=right | 0
| align=right | 9
|-
|- bgcolor="#FFFFFF"
| Steve Rogers
|  Cronulla-Sutherland Sharks
| 
| align=right | 0
| align=right | 7
| align=right | 2
| align=right | 0
| align=right | 0
| align=right | 6
|-
|- bgcolor="#FFFFFF"
| Paul Sait
|  South Sydney Rabbitohs
| 
| align=right | 4
| align=right | 13
| align=right | 2
| align=right | 0
| align=right | 0
| align=right | 6
|-
|- bgcolor="#FFFFFF"
| Geoff Starling
|  Balmain Tigers
| 
| align=right | 5
| align=right | 13
| align=right | 8
| align=right | 0
| align=right | 0
| align=right | 24
|-
|- bgcolor="#FFFFFF"
| Gary Stevens
|  South Sydney Rabbitohs
| 
| align=right | 3
| align=right | 8
| align=right | 1
| align=right | 0
| align=right | 0
| align=right | 3
|-
|- bgcolor="#FFFFFF"
| David Waite
|  Wests Wollongong
| 
| align=right | 4
| align=right | 12
| align=right | 4
| align=right | 0
| align=right | 0
| align=right | 12
|-
|- bgcolor="#FFFFFF"
| Elwyn Walters
|  South Sydney Rabbitohs
| 
| align=right | 4
| align=right | 15
| align=right | 2
| align=right | 0
| align=right | 0
| align=right | 6
|-
|- bgcolor="#FFFFFF"
| Dennis Ward
|  Western Suburbs Rosellas
| 
| align=right | 0
| align=right | 8
| align=right | 1
| align=right | 0
| align=right | 0
| align=right | 3
|-
|- bgcolor="#FFFFFF"
| Lionel Williamson
|  Newtown Bluebags
| 
| align=right | 3
| align=right | 9
| align=right | 0
| align=right | 0
| align=right | 0
| align=right | 0
|-

1973 NSWRFL Premiers Manly-Warringah provided a record 6 players to the Kangaroos.

Great Britain 
The Ashes series against Great Britain saw an aggregate crowd of 36,567 attending the Test series

Test Venues 
The three Ashes series tests took place at the following venues.

The Ashes series

First Test 
In the first rugby league international played at Wembley since 1963, the Lions shocked the then unbeaten Australian's 21-12 in front of just 9,874 fans. The match had been moved to Wembley from the Central Park ground in Wigan at the request of the Australian team management.

Second Test 
The second test at Headingley in Leeds saw the Australian's tie the series at one game all with a 14-6 win in front of the tours largest attendance of 16,674.

Kangaroos captain-coach Graeme Langlands was ruled out of the second test with a broken hand. To replace him at fullback, Langlands selected Manly-Warringah's 19 year old dual premiership winning fullback Graham Eadie to make his test debut (Eadie, known affectionately as "Wombat", would turn 20 the next day). Eadie was also handed the goal kicking duties on the day and despite a very strong wind making conditions tricky for kickers, kicked 5 goals which proved vital in the Kangaroos 14-6 win over the Lions to keep The Ashes series alive.

After conceding 4 tries in the first test loss at Wembley, the Kangaroos kept their line intact with the Lions only scores coming from 3 goals by prop forward Terry Clawson.

Third Test 
The Kangaroos won back The Ashes with a hard fought 15-5 win in trying conditions at Warrington. The pitch at Wilderspool was frozen which suited the Australians who were used to playing on hard grounds at home.

With coach Graeme Langlands still out with a broken hand and looking on from the sidelines, the Kangaroos wrapped up the Ashes with a 15-5 win on the frozen ground at Wilderspool. Man of the match Ken Maddison crossed for two tries while Warrington born Bob Fulton, centre Geoff Starling and hooker Elwyn Walters also crossed for tries. For the Lions, their only score came from a try and goal from Hull Kingston Rovers halfback Roger Millward.

France 

|- bgcolor="#CCCCFF"
| Date
| Opponent
| Score
| Ground
| Referee
| Crowd
| Report
|- bgcolor=pink
| 9 December
| France
| 9 – 21
| Stade Gilbert Brutus, Perpignan
| G. Jameau (FRA)
| 5,109
|
|-
|- bgcolor="#FFFFFF"
| 12 December
| France XIII
| 12 – 24
| Stade Chaban-Delmas, Bordeaux
|
| 2,523
|
|-
|- bgcolor=pink
| 16 December
| France
| 3 – 14
| Stade des Minimes, Toulouse
| M. Caillol (FRA)
| 7,060
|
|-

French Tests

First test

Second Test 
Arthur Beetson became the first aboriginal player to captain Australia in a rugby league Test match.

References

External links 
 1973 Kangaroo Tour at Rugby League Project

Australia national rugby league team tours
Rugby league tours of Great Britain
Rugby league tours of France
Kangaroo tour of Great Britain and France
Kangaroo tour of Great Britain and France
Kangaroo tour of Great Britain and France